Vitālijs Samoilovs (born 17 April 1962) is a retired Latvian professional ice hockey player who played in the Soviet Hockey League. Ethnically Russian, he played for Dynamo Riga and Sokil Kyiv.

The best season of his career was 1987-88, in which he made the Soviet National Team.  He was the third-string goaltender at the 1987 Canada Cup and didn't appear in any games.  He did, however, play in one game for the gold-medal-winning Soviet team at the 1988 Winter Olympics.  Also that season, he backstopped Riga to a surprising second-place finish in the Championship League.

The following year, however, an injury caused him to lose his starting job in Riga to upstart Arturs Irbe and he never again regained his top form.

References 

Vitālijs Samoilovs profile at Latvian Olympic Committee

1962 births
Living people
Dinamo Riga players
Latvian ice hockey goaltenders
Olympic medalists in ice hockey
Sokil Kyiv players
Ice hockey people from Riga
Ice hockey players at the 1988 Winter Olympics
Olympic ice hockey players of the Soviet Union
Olympic gold medalists for the Soviet Union
Medalists at the 1988 Winter Olympics
Honoured Masters of Sport of the USSR